Edgard Maxence (17 September 1871 – 31 July 1954) was a French Symbolist painter.

Life 

He was taught by Elie Delaunay and Gustave Moreau at the École des Beaux-Arts in Paris. He is a contemporary of Henri Evenepoel, Jules Flandrin, Albert Marquet, Henri Matisse, Léon Printemps, Georges Rouault and other notable alumni from this famous school. He exhibited in the Salon des Artistes Français from 1894 until 1939, and was active on the salon's committees and juries. Maxence combined a highly trained technique with a taste for medieval and mythical subjects and for hermetic imagery; he exhibited at the Salon de la Rose+Croix from 1895 to 1897.

In 1920 he painted the image of Our Lady on the vaulted ceiling of the choir in the Basilica of the Rosary in Lourdes. He also illustrated the book Sainte-Jeanne-d'Arc (1945) by Jean-Joseph-Léonce Villepelet (Bishop of Nantes 1936–1966).

Works in museums or public galleries 
In the Musée d'Orsay, Paris
 Femme à l'Orchidée, 1900
 Sérénité, ca. 1912
 Tête de jeune fille, 1932
 Fleurs des champs, ca. 1950
 Portrait de jeune fille, ca. 1900, Musée des Beaux-Arts de Rennes
 "Le Livre de Paix", Musée des Beaux-Arts de Bordeaux 
 L'âme de la forêt, 1898, Musée des Beaux-Arts de Nantes.
 Le Livre de Paix, 1913, Art Gallery of New South Wales

External links 

1871 births
1954 deaths
Artists from Nantes
École des Beaux-Arts alumni
19th-century French painters
French male painters
20th-century French painters
20th-century French male artists
French portrait painters
French Symbolist painters
Officiers of the Légion d'honneur
19th-century French male artists